Milivojevci is a village in Požega-Slavonia County, Croatia. The village is administered as a part of the Velika municipality.
According to national census of 2011, population of the village is 17. The village is connected by the Ž4100 county road.

Sources

Populated places in Požega-Slavonia County